Julio César Schupp Rodríguez (d. 21 February 2005 in Asunción) was a Paraguayan diplomat.

Biography
He was Executive Secretary of LAFTA and afterwards Secretary-General of ALADI (1980-1984).

He also served as Paraguayan Ambassador to Uruguay.

Personal life
Married to Lucy Montanaro. They had three children: Marcelo, María Stefania, and Álvaro María.

References

Year of birth missing
2005 deaths
People from Asunción
Paraguayan people of German descent
Paraguayan diplomats
Ambassadors of Paraguay to Uruguay